The Aqsa Mosque is the largest mosque of the Ahmadiyya Muslim Community in Pakistan. Its foundation stone was laid down in 1966. The mosque was inaugurated on March 31, 1972 by the head of the worldwide Community, Mirza Nasir Ahmad. This is the main mosque of the Ahmadiyya Muslim Community in Rabwah which can accommodate up to 20,000 worshippers.

History

Construction 
In 1964, it was desired that a Jama Masjid should be built in Rabwah as the Masjid Mubarak capacity became insufficient. An appeal for funds for the mosque was launched on 7 July 1964 in Al-Fazl newspaper and by 21 July 1964, the funds were arranged and appeal in the newspaper was stopped. The foundation stone was laid with a stone from the Aqsa Mosque, India by late Mirza Nasir Ahmad on 28 October 1966 in a ceremony attended by 5,000 guests.

Post 1984 
On 26 April 1984, Pakistan passed an Ordinance XX and the head of worldwide Ahmadiyya Muslim Community, Mirza Tahir Ahmad migrated to London. Due to security concerns and Persecution of Ahmadis in Pakistan, a boundary wall was built around the mosque premises. The construction started in July 1987 and was completed by February 1989.

Construction and design

The design was prepared by Abdul Rashid, at the behest of Mirza Basheer-ud-Din Mahmood Ahmad who was the head of the Ahmadiyya Muslim Community at the time. The construction blueprint was already prepared during his lifetime, but the foundation could not be laid down by him due to the Indo-Pakistani War of 1965. The column-free main hall is 1,640 square meter and courtyard is 4,520 square meter in size. The design was said to be inspired by the Badshahi Mosque and Jama Masjid, Delhi. Together with the 6,500 m2 large compound, the mosque can accommodate up to 20,000 worshippers. The mosque has a total of 6 minarets, four of which are about 20 m and two are 12 m high.

The construction of the mosque cost approximately 1.5 million Rupees, most of which was borne by Muhammad Siddique Bani, on his request, his name was not published till his death. After his demise, the rest of the cost was paid by Sheikh Abdul Majeed.

See also 
 Nusrat Jehan Academy

References

External links 
Aqsa Mosque
 panoramio.com: Aqsa Mosque, Rabwah
 panoramio.com: Aqsa Mosque, Rabwah
 panoramio.com: Annual Convention, Rabwah - Pakistan (Aqsa Mosque)

Mosques completed in 1972
Ahmadiyya mosques in Pakistan
Religious buildings and structures in Punjab, Pakistan